Saint Stephen's Purse (or Stephansburse) is a rectangular gold 9th-century reliquary studded with gem stones that is part of the Imperial Regalia of the Holy Roman Empire.  It consists of a purse containing soil that is claimed to be soaked with the blood of St. Stephen. It is held in the Kunsthistorisches Museum in Austria.

References

Imperial Regalia of the Holy Roman Empire